Rubén Caba, born in Madrid, is a Spanish novelist and essayist. Degrees in Law and in Philosophy at de Universidad Complutense de Madrid. And graduated in Sociology at Instituto de Estudios Políticos, Madrid.

Bibliography
Script: Libro de buen amor. Película estrenada en 1970 en Madrid
Political opinion survey: 389 Escritores españoles opinan. Bilbao: La Gran Enciclopedia Vasca, 1971
Poems: Ímpetu, pasión y fuga. Madrid: Alfaguara, 1972
Carta en cuaderna vía. Premio “Arcipreste de Hita”, 1982. Jaén: Alcalá la Real, 1982

Short stories: El amigo viajero de Beppo Abdul Wahab. Madrid: Premios del tren, Fundación de los Ferrocarriles Españoles, 2004
El rigor de las desdichas. Madrid: Premios del tren, Fundación de los Ferrocarriles Españoles, 2005

Travel books: Salida con Juan Ruiz a probar la sierra. Madrid: Helios, 1976
2ª ed., con el título Por la ruta serrana del Arcipreste, Madrid: Cenit, 1977.
 3ª ed. Madrid: Libertarias-Phodhufi, 1995
 4ª ed. Madrid: Gadir, 2018
Rutas literarias de España (coord. y coaut.). Madrid: Aguilar, 1990
Literary routes of Spain. Madrid, Aguilar, 1990

Essays: Los sagrados misterios de la literatura. Madrid: Libertarias-Phodhufi, 1993
La odisea de Cabeza de Vaca (co-author). Barcelona y Buenos Aires: Edhasa, 2008 [www.edhasa.es]. (This historical essay clarifies the text of Shipwrecks, as well as it establishes the route taken by Álvar Núñez Cabeza de Vaca and his three companions. The authors followed the complete route from Tampa to Culiacán (México), near the Pacific coast, in the summer of 2004). .
Topicario. Manual del perfecto trepador. Sevilla: Renacimiento, 2010
Naufragios, de Álvar Núñez Cabeza de Vaca. Col. Letras Hispánicas. Edición crítica de Eloísa Gómez-Lucena y Rubén Caba. Madrid: Cátedra, 2018. 

Novels: Islario. Madrid: Nuevo Sendero, 1980
Hispán e Iberia. Madrid: Alfaguara, 1981.- 6ª ed. 1990
La puerta de marfil. Madrid: Orígenes, 1988
Las piedras del Guairá. (1ª fundación de Buenos Aires). Premio “América Hispana”, 1992. Diputación de Guadalajara, 1993
2ª edición, Madrid: Fondo de Cultura Económica, 1996
Días de gloria. Valencia: Pre-Textos, 2000
Los Siderales. Sevilla: Renacimiento, 2017

Prizes 
Arcipreste de Hita Prize (1982), for his poem Carta en cuaderna vía.
América Hispana Prize (1992), for Las piedras del Guairá, historic novel for the first foundation of Buenos Aires by Pedro de Mendoza in 1536.
Premios del Tren (2004), for the tale El amigo viajero de Beppo Abdul Wahab.
Premios del Tren (2005), for the tale El rigor de las desdichas.

Secondary literature
Diccionario de literatura española e hispanoamericana. Madrid: Alianza Editorial, 1993
Diccionario de escritores en lengua castellana. Madrid: Ministerio de Cultura, 2004

External links 
 (About Literary routes of Spain)
 (Film Libro de Buen Amor)
 (Abstract about the travel of Cabeza de Vaca in the 16th century)
 (Interview about Cabeza de Vaca)

Living people
Spanish essayists
Spanish novelists
Spanish male novelists
Male essayists
Year of birth missing (living people)